Rábade  or San Vicenzo de Rábade is a town in the northwest of Spain in the province of Lugo. It is the smallest municipality in Galicia. Rábade has a population of about 1500 and an area of 5.2 km². It is at an altitude of 400 meters.

Until 28 May 1925 Rábade was part of Begonte.

Rábade holds market days on the 2nd and 22nd of every month and on those days you can eat a traditional dish: octopus. It has celebrations on 22 and 23 January and 15 August. The Copa Miño de Piragüismo is a local tourist attraction.

References

External links
Concello de Rabade official website

Municipalities in the Province of Lugo